There have been two baronetcies created for members of the Hanmer family of Flintshire, Wales, one in the Baronetage of England and one in the Baronetage of Great Britain. Only one creation is extant as of 2008. The third Baronet of the second creation was elevated to the peerage as Baron Hanmer in 1872, a title which became extinct in 1881. The family name derived from the manor of Hanmer in the Diocese of St. Asaph.

The Hanmer Baronetcy, of Hanmer in the County of Flint, was created in the Baronetage of England on 8 July 1620 for John Hanmer, subsequently Member of Parliament for Flintshire. The second Baronet represented Flint and Flintshire in the House of Commons. The third Baronet was Member of Parliament for Flint and Evesham and was killed in a duel. His nephew the fourth Baronet sat for Thetford, Flintshire and Suffolk and served as Speaker of the House of Commons. The title became extinct on the latter's death in 1746.

The Hanmer Baronetcy, of Hanmer in the County of Flint, was created in the Baronetage of Great Britain on 21 May 1774 for Walden Hanmer, Member of Parliament for Sudbury. The third Baronet represented Shrewsbury, Kingston upon Hull and Flint in Parliament. On 1 October 1872 he was raised to the Peerage of the United Kingdom as Baron Hanmer, of Hanmer, and of Flint, both in the County of Flint. The barony became extinct when he died childless on 8 March 1881 while he was succeeded in the baronetcy by his younger brother, the fourth Baronet. The sixth Baronet was high sheriff of Flintshire in 1902. The eighth Baronet was high sheriff of Clwyd in 1977 and deputy lieutenant of the region in 1978.

Five other members of the family may also be mentioned. Job Hanmer, second son of the first Baronet, was a captain in the Royal Navy. His son Job Thomas Syer Hanmer was also a captain in the Royal Navy. His son John Graham Job Hanmer was a rear-admiral in the Royal Navy. Patrick William Talgai Hanmer, great-grandson of William Hanmer, sixth son of second Baronet, was a captain in the Royal Navy. Harry Ivan Hanmer (1893–1984), grandson of Reverend Henry Hanmer, brother of the third and fourth Baronets, was a group captain in the Royal Air Force. John Michael Hanmer (1907–1977), another grandson of Reverend Henry Hanmer, was a brigadier in the British Army.

The most ancient of the several versions of the coat of arms of the English family of Hanmer or Hanmore is described in heraldic terms as follows in Burke's 1844 Encyclopedia of Heraldry:

 Arms.-- Argent, two lions passant guardant azure, armed and langued gules.
 Crest.-- On a chapeau azure, turned up ermine, a lion sejant, guardant, argent.
 Motto.-- Guardez l'honneur.

Hanmer baronets, of Hanmer (1620)
 Sir John Hanmer, 1st Baronet (–1624)
 Sir Thomas Hanmer, 2nd Baronet (1612–1678)
 Sir John Hanmer, 3rd Baronet (died 1701)
 Sir Thomas Hanmer, 4th Baronet (1677–1746) (eldest son of William, 2nd son of 2nd Bt.)

Hanmer baronets, of Hanmer (1774)
 Sir Walden Hanmer, 1st Baronet (1717–1783)
 Sir Thomas Hanmer, 2nd Baronet (1747–1828)
 Sir John Hanmer, 3rd Baronet (1809–1881) (created Baron Hanmer in 1872)

Barons Hanmer (1872)
 John Hanmer, 1st Baron Hanmer (1809–1881)

Hanmer baronets, of Hanmer (1774; reverted)
 Sir Wyndham Edward Hanmer, 4th Baronet (1810–1887)
 Sir Edward John Henry Hanmer, 5th Baronet (1843–1893)
 Sir Wyndham Charles Henry Hanmer, 6th Baronet (1867–1922)
 Sir (Griffin Wyndham) Edward Hanmer, 7th Baronet (1893–1977)
 Sir John Wyndham Edward Hanmer, 8th Baronet (1928–2008)
 Sir Wyndham Richard Guy Hanmer, 9th Baronet (born 1955)

Notes

References 
 Kidd, Charles, Williamson, David (editors). Debrett's Peerage and Baronetage (1990 edition). New York: St Martin's Press, 1990, 
 

Baronetcies in the Baronetage of Great Britain
Extinct baronetcies in the Baronetage of England
1620 establishments in England
1774 establishments in Great Britain